Panteón Jardín ("Garden Cemetery") is a cemetery in Mexico City in which several notable people are interred. It is located in the southwest of the city, between the San Ángel and Olivar de los Padres boroughs.

It is a garden cemetery, built in what used to be the outskirts of the city in the 1930s. It's wide central boulevard leads to a small hill in the back. It's near 150 acres are used mostly for Catholic burials, but has a special section for Jewish ones, called La Fraternidad (The Fraternity). Since 1946, another section belongs to the National Association of Actors (National Association of Actors), used mainly for actors and actresses. It has a capacity of 85,000 graves. It's non-denominational, and even as a private cemetery, it's open to the public.

Notable people buried here are artists, musicians, actors and actresses, politicians and presidents. This makes it a tourist attraction and pilgrimage site for the fans of popular culture Mexican actors, specially from the Golden Age of Mexican cinema, like Pedro Infante, Jorge Negrete and Pedro Armendariz. Every April 15, a multitude of up to 7,000 people come to the grave of Pedro Infante paying homage to the beloved actor, bringing flowers and photos, playing music with mariachis and riding motorcycles.

Notable burials

Artists and painters
 Cordelia Urueta
 Dalla Husband
 Francisco Díaz de León
 Guillermo Meza
 Luis Cernuda - Spanish poet
 Mercedes Pinto - Spanish writer
 Raúl Anguiano
 Remedios Varo
 Xavier Guerrero

Actors

 Alejandra Meyer
 Amalia Aguilar
 Andrés Soler
 Ángel Garasa
 Arturo de Córdova
 Blanca Estela Pavón
 Carlos López Moctezuma
 David Silva (actor)
 Domingo Soler
 Elvira Quintana
 Esperanza Iris
 Enrique Lizalde
 Enrique Rambal
 Enriqueta Reza
 Esperanza Iris
 Esther Fernández
 Fanny Cano
 Fernando Soto  «Mantequilla» 
 Francisco Avitia «El Charro» 
 Germán Valdés «Tin-Tán» 
 Gloria Marín
 Gonzalo Vega
 Javier Solís
 Joaquín Pardavé
 Jorge Negrete
 Julián Soler
 
 Manuel Noriega Ruiz
 Mercedes Soler
 Miguel Aceves Mejía
 Ninón Sevilla
 Norma Angélica Ladrón de Guevara
 Ofelia Montesco
 Óscar Ortiz de Pinedo
 Pedro Armendariz
 Pedro Armendáriz Jr.
 Pedro Infante
 Prudencia Grifell
 Ramón Valdés «Don Ramón» 
 Salvador Flores Rivera «Chava Flores» 
 Tito Junco
 Toña la Negra

Musicians
 Álvaro Carrillo
 Alfonso Esparza Oteo
 Gonzalo Curiel
 Pepe Guízar
 Tomás Méndez

Others
 Adolfo López Mateos and his wife Eva Sámano -  Former Mexican president and First Lady
 Daniel Cosío Villegas - Economist and scholar
 Elena Arizmendi Mejía - Neutral White Cross founder
 Guillermo González Camarena - Inventor of a type of color television
 Gustavo Díaz Ordaz and his wife Guadalupe Borja - Former Mexican president and First Lady
 José Miguel Noguera - Football player
 Kid Azteca - Boxer
 Kingo Nonaka
  - Bullfighter
 María Teresa Pomar - Folk art scholar
 Manuel Palafox - Politician and soldier

References

External links 

 

Cemeteries in Mexico City